Elham Fakhari (born in Isfahan, 1994) is a psychologist, painter, poet and former member of the Islamic Council of Tehran, Ray Cities and Tajrish and the head of the Islamic Council of Tehran Province.

She also serves as a secretary in the 'Supreme Policy Council of Iran Reformists'.

Activities 
Member of the Institute for the Development of Contemporary Visual Arts 

Alternate member of Isfahan Islamic Council - second period [8]

The first Chairwoman of the council in Tehran province [4][5][6][7]

Member of Shemiranat City Implementation Committee

The best entrepreneur of Isfahan province (2015) 

Top Researcher of Al-Zahra University (2012) 

Member of the Cultural and Social Commission of Tehran Islamic Council

Head of Art Committee, Social Committee and Child Friendly Committee of Tehran

Manager in charge of "avaye-maani" Publishing

The responsible director of "Maani" Counseling and Psychology Center

Member of the Education Council of the Tehran province

Shemiranat city council member

Books 
- The psychology book Learning together in class - Saless Publications

- The poetry book "Smell of Calendula" from Elham Fakhari's poetry collection - Nasira Publications

- The poetry book "echo of words" from Elham Fakhari's poetry collection - Nasira Publications

References

1975 births
Living people
Members of the Reformists' Supreme Council for Policymaking
Union of Islamic Iran People Party politicians
Tehran Councillors 2017–
Al-Zahra University alumni